Jafarabad (also Romanized as Ja‘farābād; also known as Ja‘farābāb) is a village in Qaleh Asgar Rural District, Lalehzar District, Bardsir County, Kerman Province, Iran. At the 2006 census, its population was 201, in 48 families.

References 

Populated places in Bardsir County